The Petrochemical Heritage Award was established in 1997, "to recognize individuals who made outstanding contributions to the petrochemical community." The award is intended to inspire achievement and to promote public understanding. The award winner is chosen annually by the Founders Club and the Science History Institute (formerly the Chemical Heritage Foundation). The award is traditionally presented at the International Petrochemical Conference hosted by the American Fuel and Petrochemical Manufacturers (AFPM), formerly known as NPRA, the National Petrochemical & Refiners Association.

Recipients
The following people have received the Petrochemical Heritage Award:

 2020, Jim Teague, CEO of Enterprise Products
 2019, James Y. Chao and Albert Chao, founders of the Westlake Chemical Corporation
 2018, Gary K. Adams,  former president, CEO, and chair of the board of Chemical Market Associates
 2017, David N. Weidman, retired chair and CEO of Celanese Corporation
 2016, Stephen D. Pryor, retired president of ExxonMobil Chemical Company
 2015, James L. Gallogly, former chief executive officer of LyondellBasell
 2014, Frank Popoff, retired chairman and chief executive officer of the Dow Chemical Company
 2013, Jim Ratcliffe, INEOS Founder and CEO
 2012, Marvin O. Schlanger, chairman of the supervisory board of LyondellBasell Industries
 2011, Raj Gupta, former chairman and CEO of Rohm and Haas
 2010, Hiromasa Yonekura, chairman of the Sumitomo Chemical Company
 2009, Mohamed Al-Mady, vice chairman and CEO of the Saudi Basic Industries Corporation (SABIC)
 2008, Peter R. Huntsman, president and CEO of the Huntsman Corporation
 2008, Dave C. Swalm, founder of Texas Petrochemicals Company/Texas Olefins
 2007, Dan L. Duncan, chairman, Enterprise Products Partners
 2006, J. Virgil Waggoner, former president and CEO of Sterling Chemicals
 2005, Ting Tsung Chao, founder of the Westlake Chemical Corporation
 2004, William A. McMinn, Jr., former president of Cain Chemical
 2003, Harold Sorgenti, former president and chief executive officer of ARCO Chemical Company
 2002, Herbert D. "Ted" Doan, former chairman and CEO of the Dow Chemical Company
 2001, Jon M. Huntsman, founder of Huntsman Corporation
 2000, Ralph Landau, cofounder of Scientific Design Group and Halcon.
 1999, John R. Hall, chemical engineer and former president, chairman, and CEO of Ashland
 1998, John T. Files, founder and chairman of the Merichem Company
 1997, Gordon Cain, chemical engineer and entrepreneur

Photo gallery

See also

 List of chemistry awards

References

Business and industry awards
Petrochemical industry